Tysons Creek is a  long 3rd order tributary to the Deep River in Moore County, North Carolina.  This is the only stream in the United States by this name.

Course
Tysons Creek rises in a pond about 0.25 miles northeast of Harpers Crossroads in Chatham County and then flows south into Moore County to join the Deep River about 1 mile northwest of Glendon, North Carolina.

Watershed
Tysons Creek drains  of area, receives about 47.8 in/year of precipitation, and has a wetness index of 400.09 and is about 51% forested.

See also
List of rivers of North Carolina

References

Rivers of North Carolina
Rivers of Chatham County, North Carolina
Rivers of Moore County, North Carolina